Anslow is a surname. Notable people with the name include the following:

 Gladys Anslow (1892–1969), American physicist
 Hub Anslow (1926–2006), Canadian ice hockey left winger
 Stan Anslow (1931–2017), English footballer

See also
 Tonman Mosley, 1st Baron Anslow (1850–1933), British businessman, judge and politician